Josh Point Wolf (born October 19, 1969) is an American comedian, actor, and writer. He has written for a number of sitcoms, including All of Us and Cuts. He is best known for his regular appearances on the round table of E!'s late-night talk show Chelsea Lately.

Career
He was introduced to comedy at the age of sixteen, doing an entire set about his parents' gas. Having moved to Seattle, he became a spokesperson for Nintendo and interviewed Bill Gates for an internal film for Microsoft. He moved once more to Los Angeles, and was spotted while doing a one-man show at the HBO Workspace. He signed a two-year deal with ABC to develop his own television show, but it was never broadcast. He instead concentrated on writing for sitcoms such as UPN's All of Us and Cuts.

Wolf is a regular on the round table of E!'s late-night talk show Chelsea Lately. He appears as one of the comedians on the "Comedians of Chelsea Lately" stand-up tour, and has previously appeared as the warm-up act for Chelsea Handler herself.

He also appeared as a finalist on the fourth season of NBC's Last Comic Standing in the "Last Comic Downloaded" segment, he was beaten by Theo Von. He is currently working on an untitled project for Fox, starring himself as a single father. It is a semi-autobiographical show, being based in part on Wolf's experiences as a single dad. He has also sold a book to Grand Central Publishing. Wolf has sold a script to Adam Sandler's Happy Madison Productions based on the true story of a traveling youth baseball team which was used as a cover for the robberies committed by its coach. On July 20, 2012, he began hosting a weekly podcast with fellow Chelsea Lately regular Ross Mathews called "Josh and Ross." That same year, Discovery Channel hired Josh for "Shark After Dark," which received great ratings.   Josh was put on live television hosting a show about sharks. In September 2013, Wolf began hosting his own podcast on the Toad Hop Network called "Off the Rails with Josh Wolf". Josh now hosts a podcast with Sarah Colonna called "Off the Rails with Josh Wolf and Sarah Colonna."

On June 11, 2015, The Josh Wolf Show, a late-night talk show which he hosts, debuted on CMT.

Personal life
Wolf is married to film director Bethany Ashton Wolf. His cousin is former Party of Five actor Scott Wolf.
On an episode of The Church of What's Happening Now with Joey Diaz, Josh detailed a true story about a food truck–style business he once ran called PB&J'S.
He was ordered to shut down after an inspector found Josh and his children making peanut butter and jelly sandwiches on an apartment floor. Josh Wolf is an alumnus of Trinity University in San Antonio, Texas.

Filmography

References

External links

1974 births
American podcasters
American stand-up comedians
American television talk show hosts
Jewish American comedians
Late night television talk show hosts
Living people
People from Boston
Trinity University (Texas) alumni
21st-century American comedians
21st-century American Jews